Louros is a town and a former municipality in the Preveza regional unit, Epirus, Greece. Since the 2011 local government reform it is part of the municipality Preveza, of which it is a municipal unit. The seat of the municipality was the small town of Louros (pop. 1,938 in 2011).  The area of the municipal unit is 176.075 km², with a population of 4,581 people (2011).  The town and municipal unit are named after the river Louros which flows just south of the town. Until recently, the Louros valley was swampy, but in modern times the marshes were drained and are now used for the production of olives, oranges and tomatoes.  Besides the town of Louros itself, the largest towns in the municipality are Néos Oropós (pop. 1,304), Stefáni (440), Vrysoúla (172), Áno Ráchi (127), and Áno Kotsanópoulo (159).

Subdivisions
The municipal unit Louros is subdivided into the following communities (constituent villages in brackets):
Ano Rachi
Kotsanopoulo (Ano Kotsanopoulo, Kato Kotsanopoulo)
Louros
Neo Sfinoto
Oropos (Neos Oropos)
Revmatia (Revmatia, Kato Revmatia)
Skiadas (Skiadas, Aloni, Kontates)
Stefani
Trikastro
Vrysoula

External links
Official website

References

Populated places in Preveza (regional unit)